Nagai may refer to:

Nagai (surname), a Japanese surname
Nagai, Yamagata, a city in Yamagata Prefecture, Japan
An alternative name for Nagapattinam district, Tamil Nadu, India
Nagai (Star Wars), a fictional alien race in the Star Wars franchise

People with the given name
Nagai Sriram, Indian musician and Carnatic violinist